De Lorenzi is a surname. Notable people with the surname include:

 Christian De Lorenzi (born 1981), Italian biathlete
 Gianluca de Lorenzi (born 1972), Italian auto racing driver
 Marie-Laure de Lorenzi (born 1961), French professional golfer

See also
 De Lorenzo